Antonius Maria van Heugten (9 September 1945 – 27 March 2008) was a Dutch sidecarcross rider and the 1981 World Champion in the sport, together with his passenger Frits Kiggen.

He has also won the Dutch national sidecarcross championship four times, 1975, 1976, 1979 and 1980 and the FIM European Championship in 1975.

Biography
Antonius Maria van Heugten, commonly referred to as Ton van Heugten, was born on 9 September 1945, as the second-last of fifteen children. He was born into a family of motocross enthusiasts, having nine brothers and five sisters. One of his brothers, Cor van Heugten, was Dutch national sidecarcross champion, from 1964 to 1966, while another brother, Fons van Heugten, also competed in the FIM European Championship.

Ton van Heugten was a BMX pioneer in the Netherlands, taking part in competitive races when he wasn't allowed to race motocross in the 1950s.

He began riding in the solo class from the age of ten, but was not allowed to take part in competitions due to his age. He won the Dutch national championship in the 50 cc class in 1963, in the 250 cc class in 1964 and 1965 and in the 500 cc class in 1966. He also competed in the Motocross World Championship. He suffered a complicated leg fracture in 1966.

Van Heugten took up the sidecarcross sport in 1971 and remained active in motor sport until 1989. As his reason for switching from the solo version of the sport to the sidecarcross one at the age of 25, he stated that he considered it too late to switch once he was over 30.

In 1982, he and Frits Kiggen took part in the Rally Paris-Dakar.

Ton van Heugten died on 27 March 2008 of a heart attack, aged 62. He was buried in his home town Amersfoort on 2 April 2008.

Sidecarcross world championship results
Ton van Heugten made his debut in the FIM Cup, a predecessor of the world championship, in 1972, in the second year of the competition. With his passenger Jaak Wery he achieved a third place overall in the competition.

In 1974, he switched passengers, racing with Dick Steenbergen. He raced with Steenbergen for five seasons, winning the competition, now renamed the FIM European Championship, in 1975. The team had a difficult year in 1978, struggling in the domestic championship and finishing only twelfth in Europe.

From 1979, Ton van Heugten used Frits Kiggen as his passenger, the two becoming a very successful combination. From 1980 onwards, the European championship was renamed the FIM World Championship and van Heugten, finishing fourth in its first year, became the second world champion in 1981, despite Kiggen, his passenger, having broken his collar bone during the season and having to be replaced with Sies Hurkmans for four races.

Ton van Heugten continued to be a successful rider in the world championship, finishing in the top-three four more times. He won his last world championship race at the Portuguese GP in 1986, his last really strong season, finishing third overall.

Ton van Heugten continued to race internationally until 1989, when he retired.

Season by season
The competition which was to become the sidecarcross world championship in 1980 originated as the FIM Cup in 1971 and was renamed to European championship in 1975. Van Heugtens's results in these three competitions were:

 With the exception of Ralph Hoormann, who was German, all his passengers were Dutch nationals.

Honours

World Championship
 Champions: (1) 1981
 Runners-up: (1) 1984

European Championship
 Champions: (1) 1975

Netherlands
 Champions: (4) 1975, 1976, 1979, 1980

References

External links
 Article on Ton van Heugten  from the NRC Handelsblad
 The official FIM website
 The World Championship on Sidecarcross.com

1945 births
2008 deaths
Dutch sidecarcross riders
Dakar Rally drivers
Sportspeople from Amersfoort
Dutch motocross riders
20th-century Dutch people
21st-century Dutch people